The 2022 ACC Women's T20 Championship was a women's Twenty20 International (WT20I) cricket tournament that was held in Malaysia from 17 to 25 June 2022. The tournament was organised by the Asian Cricket Council (ACC) and the top two sides qualified for the 2022 Women's Twenty20 Asia Cup. The series was the last to be played at the Kinrara Academy Oval before the ground closed on 30 June 2022.

The tournament was contested by 10 teams, including the hosts Malaysia, as well as Bahrain, Bhutan, Hong Kong, Kuwait, Nepal, Oman, Qatar, Singapore and United Arab Emirates. The ACC Women's Championship was last contested in 2013.

The tournament began with comfortable victories for Nepal and Malaysia, before both afternoon matches were both abandoned after rain stopped play. Following the conclusion of the group stage, the UAE, Hong Kong, Malaysia and Nepal had all reached the semi-finals of the tournament. The first semi-final finished in a no result due to rain, with the UAE progressing to the tournament's final because of their superior net run rate in the group stage. The second semi-final was also impacted by the weather, with Malaysia winning their reduced match against Hong Kong by 12 runs. In the final, the UAE beat Malaysia by five wickets to win the tournament, with both teams qualifying for the 2022 Women's Twenty20 Asia Cup. The final was the last game to be played at the Kinrara Oval.

Squads

Group stage

Group A

 Advanced to the semi-finals

Group B

 Advanced to the semi-finals

Semi-finals

Final

References

External links
 Series home at ESPN Cricinfo

2022 in women's cricket
Associate international cricket competitions in 2022
Sports competitions in Malaysia
ACC